Stan Dunklee (born August 14, 1954) is an American cross-country skier. He competed at the 1976 Winter Olympics and the 1980 Winter Olympics. He is the father of American biathlete Susan Dunklee.

References

External links
 

1954 births
Living people
American male cross-country skiers
Olympic cross-country skiers of the United States
Cross-country skiers at the 1976 Winter Olympics
Cross-country skiers at the 1980 Winter Olympics
People from Brattleboro, Vermont
Sportspeople from Vermont
Vermont Catamounts skiers